Stay Out of the Attic, also referred to as Stay Out of the F**king Attic and Stay Out of the Fucking Attic, is a 2020 horror film and the directorial debut of Jerren Lauder.

Synopsis
Ex-convicts Imani and Carlos work for Albert Schillinger, a fellow ex-con who runs a moving company. They have been hired to move the belongings of the elderly Vern Mueller, who is willing to pay extra if they can move everything in a single night, with the exception of the attic and basement. During their work, Carlos discovers that Schillinger was part of the Aryan Brotherhood while he was in jail, but has since disowned that part of his life. The group also discovers that Vern is apparently obsessed with continuing the work of Josef Mengele and before they can leave, Vern traps them in the mansion. He releases a feral mutant and kidnaps Imani, taking her to his basement laboratory where he removes one of her eyes to concoct a rejuvenation serum.

Schillinger and Carlos discover Anne, a mute girl who has been sewn to her sister Sarah. Both girls help lead them to Imani; however, before they can save her, the mutant appears. In the scuffle Vern shoots Schillinger while Carlos and the girls flee upstairs and hide in separate rooms. Carlos chooses to hide in a bathroom that Vern informs him is actually a chamber where he kills failed experiments with Zyklon B. Vern turns on the gas and leaves; however, Carlos manages to escape the bathroom and kill the mutant before it can attack the girls. Carlos then collapses, seemingly dead.

When Schillinger comes to in the basement, Vern reveals that he is actually Mengele, having survived using the serum. He can only create this serum from the optic nerves of people who have suffered greatly; however, in doing so, he has to flee once he has killed too many people in the surrounding area. Mengele informs Schillinger that he saved him because of his ties to the Aryan Brotherhood, pointing out an eagle tattoo on his chest was clearly not a jailhouse tattoo and shows that he was of high rank. This horrifies Imani, as it means that he was a member prior to jail. Schillinger manages to trick Mengele into releasing him under the guise that he still holds Nazi sympathies and he uses this opportunity to free Imani. Ultimately, Imani and the girls escape the house while Schillinger remains inside. He confronts Mengele and carves off his eagle tattoo before crushing Mengele's skull. The film ends with Albert preparing to battle several feral mutants released by a dying Mengele and a mid-credits scene shows Carlos waking up upstairs. An after-credits scene shows Schillinger, Imani, and Carlos arriving to a new area, having all survived the previous horrors of the house.

Cast
 Ryan Francis as Albert Schillinger
 Morgan Alexandria as Imani
 Bryce Fernelius as Carlos 
 Michael Flynn as Vern Mueller/Josef Mengele
 Brynne Hurlbutt as Anne
 Avery Pizzuto as Sarah
 Garrett McClellan as The Creeper

Release
Stay Out of the Attic had its world premiere on October 15, 2020 at the Atlanta Horror Film Festival. The following year it premiered as on Shudder as one of its original films on March 11, 2021.

Reception

References

External links
 

2020 horror films
American body horror films
Cultural depictions of Josef Mengele
Shudder (streaming service) original programming
2020 directorial debut films
2020 films
2020s English-language films
2020s American films